Ismael Lares was a Mexican General who participated in the Cristero War.

Early life
Lares was born in the Late 19th Century in Mexico.

Cristero War
Lares arrived from Chihuahua in order to lead the campaign in the state of Durango in 1926. Lares, despite the advice that Colonel Agapito Campos gave him to ambush the next day the enemy forces, opted for battle. In October 1926 he was killed in the port of the Arena by a enemy ambush, along with half of a regiment, about 250 men.

References

1926 deaths
Mexican generals
Year of birth missing